"Heart Beat, Pig Meat" is an instrumental song by progressive rock  band Pink Floyd from the soundtrack to the film Zabriskie Point. The song is instrumental and is credited to David Gilmour, Rick Wright, Nick Mason and Roger Waters.

Music
The song revolves around a repetitive rhythm with keyboard improvisations on top of it. Throughout the song, various orchestral clips and random clips of people talking can be heard, as well as the sound of feet running.

References

1970 songs
Instrumentals
Pink Floyd songs
Songs written by David Gilmour
Songs written by Nick Mason
Songs written by Roger Waters
Songs written by Richard Wright (musician)